The Most Auspicious Order of the Rajamitrabhorn is the highest royal order of Thailand. It was founded on 11 June 1962 by King Bhumibol Adulyadej (Rama IX) to be bestowed upon foreign heads of state. Members of the order are entitled to use the postnominals ร.ม.ภ.

Insignia
The decoration consists of a single class (Knight). The insignia for this class is:
 Collar with a diamond pendant, with the Chakra crossed over the Trident, at the centre.
 Small pendant, attached onto the yellow sash, with white and blue trims, to wear over the right shoulder to the left hip.
 Star with the figure of Narayana on the Garuda, to wear on the left breast.
 The Sovereign Grand Master of the Order is a Knight, but his star is larger and decorated with diamonds.

Recipients

See also
 Orders, decorations, and medals of Thailand

References

External links

 The Most Auspicious Order of the Rajamitrabhorn, Secretariat to the Cabinet of Thailand

 
Rajamitrabhorn, Order Of The
Rajamitrabhorn, Order Of The
Rajamitrabhorn, Order Of The
1962 establishments in Thailand